Prepuce , or as an adjective, preputial , refers to two homologous structures of male and female genitals:
Clitoral hood, skin surrounding and protecting the head of the clitoris
Foreskin, skin surrounding and protecting the head of the penis in humans
Penile sheath, skin surrounding and protecting the head of the penis in other animals